The 1962 Chico State Wildcats football team represented Chico State College—now known as California State University, Chico—as a member of the Far Western Conference (FWC) during the 1962 NCAA College Division football season. Led by fifth-year head coach George Maderos, Chico State compiled an overall record of 4–4–1 with a mark of 2–3 in conference play, placing in a three-way tie for fourth in the FWC. The team was outscored by its opponents 149 to 120 for the season. The Wildcats played home games at College Field in Chico, California.

Schedule

References

Chico State
Chico State Wildcats football seasons
Chico State Wildcats football